Zbigniew Jasiukiewicz (13 October 1947 – 10 March 2005) was a Polish volleyball player and coach, a member of the Polish national team in 1967–1976. He competed in the men's tournament at the 1968 Summer Olympics. Fiver–time Polish Champion with AZS AWF Warsaw and Resovia.

Sporting achievements

As a player
 CEV European Champions Cup 
  1972/1973 – with Resovia

 National championships
 1967/1968  Polish Championship, with AZS AWF Warsaw
 1970/1971  Polish Championship, with Resovia
 1971/1972  Polish Championship, with Resovia
 1973/1974  Polish Championship, with Resovia
 1974/1975  Polish Cup, with Resovia
 1974/1975  Polish Championship, with Resovia

External links
 
 
 Coach/Player profile at Volleybox.net

1947 births
2005 deaths
People from Zielona Góra County
Sportspeople from Lubusz Voivodeship
Polish men's volleyball players
Polish volleyball coaches
Volleyball coaches of international teams
Olympic volleyball players of Poland
Volleyball players at the 1968 Summer Olympics
Polish expatriate sportspeople in Germany
Expatriate volleyball players in Germany
Resovia (volleyball) players